Symplocos nivea is a species of plant in the family Symplocaceae. It is a tree endemic to Peninsular Malaysia.

Conservation
It is threatened by habitat loss.

References

nivea
Endemic flora of Peninsular Malaysia
Trees of Peninsular Malaysia
Endangered plants
Taxonomy articles created by Polbot